Krimini is a village located in the  Voion municipality, situated in Kozani regional unit, in the Western Macedonia region of Greece. The village of Rodochori is nearby.

The postal code is 50002, while the telephone code is +30 24680. At the 2011 census, the population was 45. 

The town is notable for the Ethnographic Museum of Krimini.

History
Krimini (from the Greek word for "precipice") is a relatively new village by Greek standards, having been formed around 1720.  Before that, the village (Old Krimini) was located further north in the Grammos mountain range, where its steep precipices and rugged terrain protected the inhabitants from persecution by the numerous conquerors of Macedonia.

References

Populated places in Kozani (regional unit)